Ralph Shaw may refer to:

 Ralph Shaw (writer) (1913–1996), British author and journalist
 Ralph R. Shaw (1907–1972), American librarian and publisher

See also
Ralph Shore (died 1430/1), MP for Derby